Shin Jung-rak (Hangul: 신정락, Hanja: 申政洛; born May 13, 1987 in Cheonan, Chungcheongnam-do) is a South Korean relief pitcher for the Hanwha Eagles of the KBO League. He bats and throws right-handed. Shin has an unorthodox style of sidearm delivery with a low-to-mid-90s fastball and a hard slider with extreme downward movement.

Amateur career
Shin attended Bugil High School in Cheonan, Chungcheongnam-do.

During his three-year college career at Korea University, Shin twice helped his team reach the final of the college national championship. That year, Shin was selected as a member of the South Korea national baseball team and competed in the Asian Baseball Championship held in Sapporo, Japan.

Notable international careers

Pro career

After his senior year at Korea University Shin, who did not allow any home run during his collegiate years, was drafted with the first overall pick of the  KBO Draft by the LG Twins. He made his pro league debut on March 27, 2010 against the Samsung Lions. In that game, Shin got his first hold, tossing 0.1 innings of perfect relief.

On July 28, 2019, he and Song Eun-beom, then a member of the LG Twins, moved through a 1:1 trade.

References

External links 
Career statistics and player information from the KBO League 

1987 births
Living people
South Korean baseball players
LG Twins players
Korea University alumni
People from Cheonan
Sportspeople from South Chungcheong Province